In the period from 1885 to 1908, many atrocities were perpetrated in the Congo Free State (today the Democratic Republic of the Congo) which, at the time, was a state under the absolute rule of King Leopold II of the Belgians. These atrocities were particularly associated with the labour policies used to collect natural rubber for export. Together with epidemic disease, famine, and a falling birth rate caused by these disruptions, the atrocities contributed to a sharp decline in the Congolese population. The magnitude of the population fall over the period is disputed, with modern estimates ranging from 1.5 million to 13 million.

At the Berlin Conference of 1884–1885, the European powers allocated most of the Congo Basin region to a supposedly philanthropic organisation run by Leopold II, who had long held ambitions for colonial expansion. The territory under Leopold's control exceeded ; amid financial problems, it was directed by a tiny cadre of administrators drawn from across Europe. Initially the quasi-colony proved unprofitable and insufficient, with the state always close to bankruptcy. The boom in demand for natural rubber, which was abundant in the territory, created a radical shift in the 1890s—to facilitate the extraction and export of rubber, all vacant land in the Congo was nationalised, with the majority distributed to private companies as concessions. Some was kept by the state. Between 1891 and 1906, the companies were allowed free rein to exploit the concessions, with the result being that forced labour and violent coercion were used to collect the rubber cheaply and maximise profit. Individual workers who refused to participate in rubber collection could be killed and entire villages razed.

Despite these atrocities, the main cause of the population decline was disease, which was exacerbated by the social disruption caused by the Free State. A number of epidemics, notably African sleeping sickness, smallpox, swine influenza and amoebic dysentery, ravaged indigenous populations. In 1901 alone it was estimated that 500,000 Congolese had died from sleeping sickness. Disease, famine and violence combined to reduce the birth-rate while excess deaths rose.

The severing of workers' hands achieved particular international notoriety. These were sometimes cut off by  soldiers who were made to account for every shot they fired by bringing back the hands of their victims. These details were recorded by Christian missionaries working in the Congo and caused public outrage when they were made known in the United Kingdom, Belgium, the United States and elsewhere. An international campaign against the Congo Free State began in 1890 and reached its apogee after 1900 under the leadership of the British activist E. D. Morel. On 15 November 1908, under international pressure, the Government of Belgium annexed the Congo Free State to form the Belgian Congo. It ended many of the systems responsible for the abuses. The size of the population decline during the period is the subject of extensive historiographical debate; there is an open debate as to whether the atrocities constitute genocide. In 2020 King Philippe of Belgium expressed his regret to the Government of Congo for "acts of violence and cruelty" inflicted during the rule of the Congo Free State, though he did not explicitly mention Leopold's role and some activists accused him of not making a full apology.

Background

Establishment of the Congo Free State 

Even before his accession to the throne of Belgium in 1865, the future king Leopold II began lobbying leading Belgian politicians to create a colonial empire in the Far East or in Africa, which would expand and enhance Belgian prestige. Politically, however, colonisation was unpopular in Belgium as it was perceived as a risky and expensive gamble with no obvious benefit to the country and his many attempts to persuade politicians met with little success.

Determined to look for a colony for himself and inspired by recent reports from central Africa, Leopold began patronising a number of leading explorers, including Henry Morton Stanley. Leopold established the International African Association, a "charitable" organisation to oversee the exploration and surveying of a territory based around the Congo River, with the stated goal of bringing humanitarian assistance and "civilisation" to the natives. In the Free State, Leopold exercised total personal control without much delegation to subordinates. African chiefs played an important role in the administration by implementing government orders within their communities. Throughout much of its existence, however, Free State presence in the territory that it claimed was patchy, with its few officials concentrated in a number of small and widely dispersed "stations" which controlled only small amounts of hinterland. In 1900, there were just 3,000 white people in the Congo, of whom only half were Belgian. The colony was perpetually short of administrative staff and officials, who numbered between 700 and 1,500 during the period.

In the early years of the colony, much of the administration's attention was focused on consolidating its control by fighting the African peoples on the colony's periphery who resisted colonial rule. These included the tribes around the Kwango, in the south-west, and the Uele in the north-east. Some of the violence of the period can be attributed to African groups using colonial support to settle scores or white administrators acting without state approval.

Economic and administrative situation 

The Free State was intended, above all, to be profitable for its investors and Leopold in particular. Its finances were frequently precarious. Early reliance on ivory exports did not make as much money as hoped and the colonial administration was frequently in debt, nearly defaulting on a number of occasions. A boom in demand for natural rubber in the 1890s, however, ended these problems as the colonial state was able to force Congolese males to work as forced labour collecting wild rubber which could then be exported to Europe and North America. The rubber boom transformed what had been an unexceptional colonial system before 1890 and led to significant profits. Exports rose from 580 to 3,740 tons between 1895 and 1900.

In order to facilitate economic extraction from the colony, land was divided up under the so-called Domain System in 1891. All vacant land, including forests and areas not under cultivation, was decreed to be "uninhabited" and thus in the possession of the state, leaving many of the Congo's resources (especially rubber and ivory) under direct colonial ownership. Concessions were allocated to private companies. Leopold kept  of territory known as the Crown Domain under personal rule, which was added to the territory he already controlled under the Private Domain. Thus most economic exploitation of the Congolese interior was undertaken by Leopold and the major concessionaires. The system was extremely profitable and ABIR made a turnover of over 100 per cent on its initial stake in a single year. The King made 70 million Belgian francs' profit from the system between 1896 and 1905. The Free State's concession system was soon copied by other colonial regimes, notably those in the neighbouring French Congo.

Atrocities

Red Rubber system and forced labour 

With the majority of the Free State's revenues derived from the export of rubber, a labour policy—known by critics as the "Red Rubber system"—was created to maximise its extraction. Labour was demanded by the administration as taxation. This created a "slave society" as companies became increasingly dependent on forcibly mobilising Congolese labour for their collection of rubber. However, the desire to maximise rubber collection, and hence the state's profits, meant that the centrally enforced demands were often set arbitrarily without considering the numbers or the welfare of workers. In the concessionary territories, the private companies which had purchased a concession from the Free State administration were able to use virtually any measures they wished to increase production and profits without state interference. The lack of a developed bureaucracy to oversee any commercial methods produced an atmosphere of "informality" throughout the state in regards to the operation of enterprises, which in turn facilitated abuses. Treatment of labourers (especially the duration of service) was not regulated by law and instead was left to the discretion of officials on the ground. The historian Jean Stengers described regions controlled by these two companies as "veritable hells-on-earth". Rubber harvesters were usually compensated for their labour with cheap items, such as a cloth, beads, a portion of salt, or a knife. On one occasion, a customary chief who ordered his subjects to gather rubber was rewarded with slaves.

Workers who refused to supply their labour were coerced with "constraint and repression". Dissenters were beaten or whipped with the chicotte, hostages were taken to ensure prompt collection and punitive expeditions were sent to destroy villages which refused. The policy led to a collapse of Congolese economic and cultural life, as well as farming in some areas. The Force had originally been established in 1885, with white officers and NCOs and black soldiers, and recruited from as far afield as Zanzibar, Nigeria, and Liberia. In the Congo, it recruited from specific ethnic and social demographics. These included the Bangala, and this contributed to the spread of the Lingala language across the country, and freed slaves from the eastern Congo. The so-called Zappo Zaps (from the Songye ethnic group) were the most feared. Reportedly cannibals, the Zappo-Zaps frequently abused their official positions to raid the countryside for slaves. By 1900, the  numbered 19,000 men.

The red rubber system emerged with the creation of the concession regime in 1891 and lasted until 1906 when the concession system was restricted. At its height, it was heavily localised in the Équateur, Bandundu, and Kasai regions.

Mutilation and brutality 

Failure to meet the rubber collection quotas was punishable by death. Meanwhile, the Force Publique were required to provide the hand of their victims as proof when they had shot and killed someone, as it was believed that they would otherwise use the munitions (imported from Europe at considerable cost) for hunting or to stockpile them for mutiny. As a consequence, the rubber quotas were in part paid off in cut-off hands.

All blacks saw this man as the devil of the Equator ... From all the bodies killed in the field, you had to cut off the hands. He wanted to see the number of hands cut off by each soldier, who had to bring them in baskets ... A village which refused to provide rubber would be completely swept clean. As a young man, I saw [Fiévez's] soldier Molili, then guarding the village of Boyeka, take a net, put ten arrested natives in it, attach big stones to the net, and make it tumble into the river ... Rubber causes these torments; that's why we no longer want to hear its name spoken. Soldiers made young men kill or rape their own mothers and sisters.

One junior officer described a raid to punish a village that had protested. The officer in command "ordered us to cut off the heads of the men and hang them on the village palisades ... and to hang the women and the children on the palisade in the form of a cross". After seeing a Congolese person killed for the first time, a Danish missionary wrote, "The soldier said 'Don't take this to heart so much. They kill us if we don't bring the rubber. The Commissioner has promised us if we have plenty of hands he will shorten our service. In Forbath's words:

The baskets of severed hands, set down at the feet of the European post commanders, became the symbol of the Congo Free State. ... The collection of hands became an end in itself.  soldiers brought them to the stations in place of rubber; they even went out to harvest them instead of rubber ... They became a sort of currency. They came to be used to make up for shortfalls in rubber quotas, to replace ... the people who were demanded for the forced labour gangs; and the  soldiers were paid their bonuses on the basis of how many hands they collected.

In theory, each right hand proved a killing. In practice, to save ammunition soldiers sometimes "cheated" by simply cutting off the hand and leaving the victim to live or die. Several survivors later said that they had lived through a massacre by acting dead, not moving even when their hands were severed, and waiting till the soldiers left before seeking help. In some instances a soldier could shorten his service term by bringing more hands than the other soldiers, which led to widespread mutilations and dismemberment. Historian David Van Reybrouck stated that the photographs of mutilated people have created a misconception that dismemberment of the living was a widespread practice. He wrote that while dismemberment of the living did occasionally happen, the practice was not as systemic as often presented. Jean Stengers and Daniel Vangroenweghe have also stated there was no systemic practice of dismembering living people as a punishment for not producing enough rubber. Most cases of dismemberment of the living were caused by soldiers who had shot people and had cut off their hands thinking they were dead while they were in fact still alive.

Leopold II reportedly disapproved of dismemberment because it harmed his economic interests. He was quoted as saying "Cut off hands—that's idiotic. I'd cut off all the rest of them, but not hands. That's the one thing I need in the Congo."

Prisons and hostage taking 

One practice used to force workers to collect rubber included taking women and family members hostage. Leopold never proclaimed it an official policy, and Free State authorities in Brussels emphatically denied that it was employed. Nevertheless, the administration supplied a manual to each station in the Congo which included a guide on how to take hostages to coerce local chiefs. The hostages could be men, women, children, elders, or even the chiefs themselves. Every state or company station maintained a stockade for imprisoning hostages. ABIR agents would imprison the chief of any village which fell behind its quota; in July 1902 one post recorded that it held 44 chiefs in prison. These prisons were in poor condition and the posts at Bongandanga and Mompono each recorded death rates of three to ten prisoners per day in 1899. Persons with records of resisting ABIR were deported to forced labour camps. There were at least three such camps: one at Lireko, one on the Upper Maringa River and one on the Upper Lopori River.

Wars and rebellions 
Aside from rubber collection, violence in the Free State chiefly occurred in connection with wars and rebellions. In 1895, a military mutiny broke out among the Batetela in Kasai, leading to a four-year insurgency. The conflict was particularly brutal and caused a great number of casualties.

Famine 
The presence of rubber companies such as ABIR exacerbated the effect of natural disasters such as famine and disease. ABIR's tax collection system forced men out from the villages to collect rubber which meant that there was no labour available to clear new fields for planting. This in turn meant that the women had to continue to plant worn-out fields resulting in lower yields, a problem aggravated by company sentries stealing crops and farm animals. The post at Bonginda experienced a famine in 1899 and in 1900 missionaries recorded a "terrible famine" across ABIR's concession.

Child colonies 
Leopold sanctioned the creation of "child colonies" in which orphaned Congolese would be kidnapped and sent to schools operated by Catholic missionaries in which they would learn to work or be soldiers; these were the only schools funded by the state. More than 50% of the children sent to the schools died of disease, and thousands more died in the forced marches into the colonies. In one such march 108 boys were sent over to a mission school and only 62 survived, eight of whom died a week later.

Labour of non-Congolese 
Indigenous Congolese were not the only ones put to work by the free state. 540 Chinese labourers were imported to work on railways in the Congo; however, 300 of them would die or leave their posts. Caribbean peoples and people from other African countries were also imported to work on the railway in which 3,600 would die in the first two years of construction from railroad accidents, lack of shelter, flogging, hunger, and disease.

Population decline

Causes 

Historians generally agree that a dramatic reduction in the overall size of the Congolese population occurred during the two decades of Free State rule in the Congo. It is argued that the reduction in the Congo was atypical and can be attributed to the direct and indirect effects of colonial rule, including disease and falling birthrate.

The historian Adam Hochschild argued that the dramatic fall in the Free State population was the result of a combination of "murder", "starvation, exhaustion and exposure", "disease" and "a plummeting birth rate". Sleeping sickness was also a major cause of fatality at the time. Opponents of Leopold's rule stated, however, that the administration itself was to be considered responsible for the spreading of the epidemic. Although it is impossible to be sure in the absence of records, violence and murder represented only a portion of the total. In a local study of the Kuba and Kete peoples, the historian Jan Vansina estimated that violence accounted for the deaths of less than five percent of the population.

Diseases imported by Arab traders, European colonists and African porters ravaged the Congolese population and "greatly exceeded" the numbers killed by violence. Smallpox, sleeping sickness, amoebic dysentery, venereal diseases (especially syphilis and gonorrhea), and swine influenza were particularly severe. Lawyer Raphael Lemkin attributed the quick spread of disease in Congo to the indigenous soldiers employed by the state, who moved across the country and had sex with women in many different places, thus spreading localised outbreaks across a larger area. Sleeping sickness, in particular, was "epidemic in large areas" of the Congo and had a high mortality rate. In 1901 alone, it is estimated that as many as 500,000 Congolese died from sleeping sickness. Vansina estimated that five percent of the Congolese population perished from swine influenza. In areas in which dysentery became endemic, between 30 and 60 percent of the population could die. Vansina also pointed to the effects of malnutrition and food shortages in reducing immunity to the new diseases. The disruption of African rural populations may have helped to spread diseases further. Nevertheless, historian Roger Anstey wrote that "a strong strand of local, oral tradition holds the rubber policy to have been a greater cause of death and depopulation than either the scourge of sleeping sickness or the periodic ravages of smallpox."

It is also widely believed that birth rates fell during the period too, meaning that the growth rate of the population fell relative to the natural death rate. Vansina, however, notes that precolonial societies had high birth and death rates, leading to a great deal of natural population fluctuation over time. Among the Kuba, the period 1880 to 1900 was actually one of population expansion.

Estimates 
A reduction of the population of the Congo is noted by several researchers who have compared the country at the beginning of Leopold's control with the beginning of Belgian state rule in 1908, but estimates of the death toll vary considerably, mainly due to the absence of reliable demographic sources about the region, as well as the sometimes unsubstantiated numbers mentioned by contemporaries in the late nineteenth and early twentieth century. Estimates of some contemporary observers suggest that the population decreased by half during this period. According to Edmund D. Morel, the Congo Free State counted "20 million souls". Other estimates of the size of the overall population decline (or mortality displacement) range between two and 13 million. Ascherson cites an estimate by Roger Casement of a population fall of three million, although he notes that it is "almost certainly an underestimate". Peter Forbath gave a figure of at least 5 million deaths, while John Gunther also supports a 5 million figure as a minimum death estimate and posits 8 million as the maximum. Lemkin posited that 75% of the population was killed.

Since no census records the population of the region at the inception of the Congo Free State (the first was taken in 1924), the precise population change in the period is not known. Despite this, Forbath more recently claimed the loss was at least five million. Demographer J.P. Sanderson estimates the population in 1885 at around 10–15 million people, and in 2020 proposed three possible scenarios of population decline under Leopold II, suggesting that the most likely scenario is a population decline of 1.5 million people, from 11.5 million people to around 10–10.3 million people during the Congo Free State period. 

Other investigators put the number of deaths significantly higher. Adam Hochschild and Jan Vansina use an approximate number of 10 million. Hochschild cites several recent independent lines of investigation, by anthropologist Jan Vansina and others, that examine local sources (police records, religious records, oral traditions, genealogies, personal diaries), which generally agree with the assessment of the 1919 Belgian government commission: roughly half the population perished during the Free State period, based on numbers from the rubber provinces. Since the first official census by the Belgian authorities in 1924 put the population at about 10 million, these various approaches suggest a rough estimate of a population decline by 10 million. Jan Vansina returned to the issue of quantifying the total population decline, and discarded his earlier claim of 10 million, he concluded that the Kuba population (one of the many Congolese populations) was rising during the first two decades of Leopold II's rule, and declined by 25 percent from 1900 to 1919, mainly due to sickness and that numbers from the rubber provinces could not be readily extrapolated to the entire Congo area. Others argued a decrease of 20 percent over the first forty years of colonial rule (up to the census of 1924). According to historian Isidore Ndaywel è Nziem 13 million died, although he later revised this number downwards to 10 million. Louis and Stengers state that population figures at the start of Leopold's control are only "wild guesses", while calling E. D. Morel's attempt and others at coming to a figure for population losses "but figments of the imagination". Generally, works based on the highest numbers have often been discredited as "wild" and "unsubstantiated", whereas authors who point out the lack of reliable demographic data are questioned by others, calling them "minimalists", "agnosticists" and "revisionists" who allegedly "seek to downplay or minimize the atrocities".

Investigation and international awareness 

Eventually, growing scrutiny of Leopold's regime led to a popular campaign movement, centred in the United Kingdom and the United States, to force Leopold to renounce his ownership of the Congo. In many cases, the campaigns based their information on reports from British and Swedish missionaries working in the Congo.

The first international protest occurred in 1890 when George Washington Williams, an American, published an open letter to Leopold about abuses he had witnessed. In a letter to the United States Secretary of State, he described conditions in the Congo as "crimes against humanity", thus coining the phrase, which would later become key language in international law. Public interest in the abuses in the Congo Free State grew sharply from 1895, when the Stokes Affair and reports of mutilations reached the European and American public which began to discuss the "Congo Question". To appease public opinion, Leopold instigated a Commission for the Protection of Natives, composed of foreign missionaries, but made few serious efforts at substantive reform.

In the United Kingdom, the campaign was led by the activist and pamphleteer E. D. Morel after 1900, whose book Red Rubber (1906) reached a mass audience. Notable members of the campaign included the novelists Mark Twain, Joseph Conrad and Arthur Conan Doyle as well as Belgian socialists such as Emile Vandervelde. In May 1903 a debate in the British House of Commons led to the passing of a resolution in condemnation of the Congo Free State. A few days later the British consul in the town of Boma, Roger Casement, began touring the Congo to investigate the true extent of the abuses. He delivered his report in December, and a revised version was forwarded to the Free State authorities in February 1904.

In an attempt to preserve the Congo's labour force and stifle British criticism, Leopold promoted attempts to combat disease to give the impression that he cared about the welfare of the Congolese and invited experts from the Liverpool School of Tropical Medicine to assist. Free State officials also defended themselves against allegations that exploitative policies were causing severe population decline in the Congo by attributing the losses to smallpox and sleeping sickness. Campaigning groups such as the Congo Reform Association did not oppose colonialism and instead sought to end the excesses of the Free State by encouraging Belgium to annex the colony officially. This would avoid damaging the delicate balance of power between France and Britain on the continent. While supporters of the Free State regime attempted to argue against claims of atrocities, a Commission of Enquiry, appointed by the regime in 1904, confirmed the stories of atrocities and pressure on the Belgian government increased.

In 1908, as a direct result of this campaign, Belgium formally annexed the territory, creating the Belgian Congo. Conditions for the indigenous population improved dramatically with the partial suppression of forced labour, although many officials who had formerly worked for the Free State were retained in their posts long after annexation. Instead of mandating labour for colonial enterprises directly, the Belgian administration used a coercive tax that deliberately pressured Congolese to find work with European employers to procure the necessary funds to make the payments. For some time after the end of the Free State the Congolese were also required to provide a certain number of days of service per year for infrastructure projects.

Historiography and the term "genocide" 

The significant number of deaths under the Free State regime has led some scholars to relate the atrocities to later genocides, though understanding of the losses under the colonial administration's rule as the result of harsh economic exploitation rather than a policy of deliberate extermination has led others to dispute the comparison; there is an open debate as to whether the atrocities constitute genocide. According to the United Nations' 1948 definition of the term "genocide", a genocide must be "acts committed with intent to destroy, in whole or in part, a national, ethnical, racial or religious group". According to Georgi Verbeeck, this conventional definition of genocide has prevented most historians from using the term to describe atrocities in the Free State; in the strict sense of the term, most historians have rejected allegations of genocide.

Sociologist Rhoda Howard-Hassmann stated that because the Congolese were not killed in a systematic fashion according to this criterion, "technically speaking, this was not genocide even in a legally retroactive sense." Hochschild and political scientist Georges Nzongola-Ntalaja rejected allegations of genocide in the Free State because there was no evidence of a policy of deliberate extermination or the desire to eliminate any specific population groups, though the latter added that nevertheless there was "a death toll of Holocaust proportions."

It is generally agreed by historians that extermination was never the policy of the Free State. According to Van Reybrouck, "It would be absurd ... to speak of an act of 'genocide' or a 'holocaust'; genocide implies the conscious, planned annihilation of a specific population, and that was never the intention here, or the result ... But it was definitely a hecatomb, a slaughter on a staggering scale that was not intentional, but could have been recognised much earlier as the collateral damage of a perfidious, rapacious policy of exploitation". Historian Barbara Emerson stated, "Leopold did not start genocide. He was greedy for money and chose not to interest himself when things got out of control." According to Hochschild, "while not a case of genocide, in the strict sense", the atrocities in the Congo were "one of the most appalling slaughters known to have been brought about by human agency".

Historians have argued that comparisons drawn in the press by some between the death toll of the Free State atrocities and the Holocaust during World War II have been responsible for creating undue confusion over the issue of terminology. In one incident, the Japanese newspaper Yomiuri Shimbun used the word "genocide" in the title of a 2005 article by Hochschild. Hochschild himself criticised the title as "misleading" and stated that it had been chosen "without my knowledge". Similar criticism was echoed by historian Jean-Luc Vellut.

Allegations of genocide in the Free State have become common over time. Political scientist Martin Ewans wrote, "Leopold's African regime became a byword for exploitation and genocide." According to historian Timothy J. Stapleton, "Those who easily apply the term genocide to Leopold's regime seem to do so purely on the basis of its obvious horror and the massive numbers of people who may have perished." Robert Weisbord argued that there does not have to be intent to exterminate all members of a population in a genocide. He posited that "an endeavor to eliminate a portion of a people would qualify as genocide" according to the UN standards and asserted that the Free State did as much. Jeanne Haskin, Yaa-Lengi Meema Ngemi, and David Olusoga also referred to the atrocities as a genocide. In an unpublished manuscript from the 1950s, Lemkin, who had first coined the term "genocide" in 1944, asserted the occurrence of "an unambiguous genocide" in the Free State, though he blamed the violence on what he saw as "the savagery of African colonial troops". Lemkin emphasized that the atrocities were usually committed by Africans themselves who were in the pay of the Belgians. These "native militia" were described by Lemkin as "an unorganized and disorderly rabble of savages whose only recompense was what they obtained from looting, and when they were cannibals, as was usually the case, in eating the foes against whom they were sent". Genocide scholar Adam Jones claimed that the underrepresentation of males in Congolese population figures after Leopold's rule is evidence that "outright genocide" was the cause of a large portion of deaths in the Free State.

In 1999 Hochschild published King Leopold's Ghost, a book detailing the atrocities committed during the Free State existence. The book became a bestseller in Belgium, but aroused criticism from former Belgian colonialists and some academics as exaggerating the extent of the atrocities and population decline. Around the 50th anniversary of the Congo's independence from Belgium in 2010, numerous Belgian writers published content about the Congo. Historian Idesbald Goddeeris criticised these works—including Van Reybrouk's Congo: A History—for taking a softened stance on the atrocities committed in the Congolese Free State, saying "They acknowledge the dark period of the Congo Free State, but...they emphasize that the number of victims was unknown and that the terror was concentrated in particular regions."

The term "Congolese genocide" is often used in an unrelated sense to refer to the mass murder and rape committed in the eastern Congo in the aftermath of the Rwandan genocide (and the ensuing Second Congo War) between 1998 and 2003.

Legacy 

The legacy of the population decline of Leopold's reign left the subsequent colonial government with a severe labour shortage and it often had to resort to mass migrations to provide workers to emerging businesses.

The atrocities of the era generated public debate about Leopold, his specific role in them, and his legacy. Belgian crowds booed at his funeral in 1909 to express their dissatisfaction with his rule of the Congo. Attention to the atrocities subsided in the following years and statues of him were erected in the 1930s at the initiative of Albert I, while the Belgian government celebrated his accomplishments in Belgium. The release of Hochschild's King Leopold’s Ghost in 1999 briefly reignited debate in Belgium, which resurfaced periodically over the following 20 years. In 2005, an early day motion before the British House of Commons, introduced by Andrew Dismore, called for the recognition of the Congo Free State's atrocities as a "colonial genocide" and called on the Belgian government to issue a formal apology. It was supported by 48 MPs.

Statues of Leopold in the Congo, which became independent in 1960, were relocated to the national museum. In 2020, following the murder of George Floyd in the United States and the subsequent protests, numerous statues of Leopold II in Belgium were vandalised as a criticism of the atrocities of his rule in the Congo. Several petitions called for the removal of the statues in Belgium and had tens of thousands of signees. Other petitions, also signed by tens of thousands of Belgians, called for the statues to remain.

On 30 June 2020, the 60th anniversary of Congolese independence, King Philippe sent a letter to Congolese President Félix Tshisekedi, expressing his "deepest regret" for "acts of violence and cruelty" committed during the existence of the Free State and other transgressions that occurred during the colonial period, but did not explicitly mention Leopold's role in the atrocities. Some activists accused him of not making a full apology.

See also 

 Brussels Anti-Slavery Conference 1889–90
 Brussels Conference Act of 1890
 Casement Report
 The King Incorporated
 Jules Marchal (1924-2003) (aka A. M. Delathuy), Belgian ambassador and CFS historian.
 Peruvian Amazon Company – a company whose rubber-related atrocities in South America were widely compared to those in the Congo Free State
 Putumayo genocide
 Royal Museum for Central Africa
 Famine in India
 British Raj

Notes

Explanatory footnotes

Citations

General and cited references

Further reading 

 
 
 
 
 
 Casement Report (1904).

External links 

 
 Rummel, Rudolph (24 June 2003). "Commentary: Exemplifying the Horror of European Colonization: Leopold's Congo". www.hawaii.edu.Link

1885 establishments in the Congo Free State
1908 disestablishments in Africa
19th-century scandals
Congo Free State
Former colonies in Africa
Genocides in Africa
History of the Democratic Republic of the Congo
Human rights abuses in the Democratic Republic of the Congo
Human trophy collecting
Leopold II of Belgium
Political controversies in Belgium
Massacres in the Democratic Republic of the Congo